Hong Kong Monopoly is an edition of the popular board game Monopoly. It features properties, railroads and utilities located in Hong Kong, in place of those from the original game.

The Hong Kong edition was originally released in 1965 by John Waddingtons. Ltd. and manufactured in Hong Kong by A.F Tompson & Son LTD. The Chinese game name called "財源廣進", and an updated version from Parker Brothers/Kenner Parker Toys LTD. was released in 1973. The name called "大富翁". In 1997 a Commemorative Edition was released to mark the Transfer of Sovereignty of Hong Kong. Another version was released in 2001 also by Parker Brothers/Hasbro Hong Kong Ltd. The most recent version, released in 2007, is a limited edition commemorating the 10th Anniversary of the Handover. Each copy of the 10th anniversary edition game has a unique number and includes a certificate of authenticity.

Properties are well-known locations all over the territory of Hong Kong. The four railways are MTR stations, while in the latest versions, those being the initial four stations of the Airport Express.

The 1997 Commemorative Edition brought further changes from the Monopoly standard. Player pieces include Hong Kong symbols.

A more widespread version of Monopoly also exists in Hong Kong. These unofficial versions were published by local companies and cost much less. All the words are in Chinese. Some well-known locations, like Shaw's Studio are considered outdated nowadays.

A "special BAUHINIA Token only for HK" edition dated 2000 by Hasbro uses Chinese and English side-by-side.

Board layout

See also
 Licensed and localized editions of Monopoly

External links

Board games introduced in 1965
Monopoly (game)
Entertainment in Hong Kong

zh:地產大亨#香港版